Infra is a studio album by neo-classical composer Max Richter, released on July 19, 2010, on FatCat Records. The album was reissued on April 25, 2014, on Deutsche Grammophon.

Album art
The album artwork is taken from the backdrop of The Royal Ballet's production Infra at the Royal Opera House in Covent Garden, London on November 11, 2008.

Critical reception

Infra received largely positive reviews from contemporary music critics. At Metacritic, which assigns a normalized rating out of 100 to reviews from mainstream critics, the album received an average score of 77, based on 14 reviews, which indicates "generally favorable reviews".

Joe Tangari of Pitchfork Media gave the album a positive review, stating, "Infra works as an enveloping and moving work even absent any knowledge of its beginnings. Others may glean different feelings from it than I do, but that is part of the point. Even if it conjures nothing of the night for you, it is some of Richter's very best work. And if you've ever cared about his music, it will make you feel something."

Track listing

Personnel
Main personnel
 Max Richter – composer, electronics, mixing, piano, primary artist
 Nick Barr – viola
 Natalia Bonner – violin
 Ian Burdge – cello
 Chris Worsey – cello
 Louisa Fuller – violin

Additional personnel
 Bill Cooper – photography
 Julian Opie – images
 Mandy Parnell – mastering
 Nick Wollage – engineer

Release history

References

2010 albums
FatCat Records albums
Max Richter albums